Israel Pincas (born January 28, 1935) is an Israeli poet.

Biography
Pincas was born in Sofia, Bulgaria in 1935. He lost his father at the age of 6. As a boy, he emigrated to the Mandate Palestine with his mother in 1944. He lives in Tel Aviv.

Published works
Pincas published his first book of poetry 14 Poems in 1961. His most famous poem is Ilmale ("Were it not") His poems were published in various circles, in the literary supplements of daily newspapers and periodicals. Many of his poems were published in the magazine Exclamation Point, after many years of nonrecognition. He has published eight books of poetry, to date, many by the Exclamation Point publishing house. He also worked as an editor for the local office of the United Press news agency. Pincas translated a number of books by Shlomo Kalo from Bulgarian to Hebrew. In 2012 he published the collection of poetry "Diskurs über die Zeit" ("Discourse about time") translated into German (Stiftung Lyrik Kabinett München).

Awards
In 2005, Pincas was awarded the Israel Prize, for poetry.

See also
List of Israel Prize recipients

References

External links
Israel Prize Official Site - CV of Israel Pinkas (in Hebrew)

1935 births
Living people
Bulgarian Jews in Israel
Bulgarian emigrants to Mandatory Palestine
Israeli people of Bulgarian-Jewish descent
Israeli poets
Israel Prize in Hebrew poetry recipients
Recipients of Prime Minister's Prize for Hebrew Literary Works